White aster is the common name of several species of plants formerly classified in Aster:

White heath aster, Symphyotrichum ericoides (Formerly Aster ericoides)
This is the species most commonly referred to as "white aster"
Upland white aster, Solidago ptarmicoides (Formerly Aster ptarmicoides)
Flat-topped white aster, Doellingeria umbellata (Formerly Aster umbellatus)
Small white aster, Symphyotrichum racemosum  (Formerly Aster racemosus)
Frequently confused in cultivation (as Aster ericoides) with S. ericoides.
White wood aster, Eurybia divaricata (Formerly Aster divaricatus)
Tall or panicled white aster, Symphyotrichum lanceolatum  (Formerly Aster lanceolatus)

See also
White Aster (Japanese poem)